Dhikri is a Nepalese steamed rice cake primarily prepared by the Tharu people of southern Nepal. It is an essential food for the Maghi festival. It is also served in other festivals such as Dashain.

It is prepared by making a dough with warm water and rice flour. The dough is given a shape of sausage. It is then steamed by placing a cotton cloth over it. It is served with spicy pickles, lentil soup or curry.

See also 
Bagiya 
Nepalese cuisine
List of Nepalese dishes

References 

Nepalese cuisine
Tharu cuisine